San Pietro in Casale is a municipality in the Metropolitan City of Bologna, in Emilia-Romagna, Italy.

San Pietro is on the main rail line from Bologna to Padua and Venice.

The name San Pietro in Casale appeared the first time in 1223.

Twin cities
 Benešov, Czech Republic

References